Mic Lowry, stylised as MiC LOWRY, is a British vocal harmony boy band from Liverpool singing pop, contemporary R&B and soul music. The five-member band was formed in 2011 and is currently made up of Delleile Ankrah, Kaine Ofoeme, Ben Sharples and Michael Welch, who all attended Calderstones School in Liverpool. They were previously signed with Universal Music Group but chose to continue independently after the release of their EPs The Show (2015) and MOOD (2017).

The band's name comes from Manchester's The Lowry Centre, which was the first venue the boys performed in. 

The band released their EP The Show in 2015 and their first single "Oh Lord" in 2016, with sampling and large rearrangement of parts of the Phil Collins hit "In the Air Tonight". Their follow-up single, "Whiskey Kisses", was released on 10 March 2017.

They appeared on BBC Introducing Merseyside stage and BBC Radio 1Xtra. In 2014 they won the MOBO Unsung Award, in 2015 were nominated for the BET Best International Newcomer and in 2016 won Liverpool's GIT Award. They opened for Justin Bieber in Liverpool, Glasgow, London, Birmingham, Leicester and Manchester in the European leg of his Purpose World Tour and performed in 37 European dates in 22 cities. They also performed in various UK venues including Manchester, Birmingham, Sheffield, Glasgow and London's The O2 Arena. In March 2017, they were picked by the American radio and television personality Elvis Duran as Artist of the Month and performed live on NBC's Today show broadcast nationally in addition to a number of media shows and live appearances in various US venues including New York and Los Angeles. On 7 March 2017, the group performed on The Wendy Williams Show.

On 19 October 2018, Mic Lowry released their first single as independent artists, "Tesla", a collaboration with the record producer Diztortion.

On 10 June 2019 they opened for the Backstreet Boys DNA tour at Manchester Arena.

Member Akia Jones left the group at the start of 2020.

On 2 September 2022, the group released their single, "Flowers", followed by a music video which was released on 30 September 2022.

Discography

EPs
2015: The Show
2017: MOOD

Singles

References

External links
Official website

English pop music groups
English boy bands
Musical groups from Liverpool
2011 establishments in England
Musical groups established in 2011